Marco Lastri (6 March 1731 – 24 December 1811) was an eclectic and polymath writer, active in Florence, region of Tuscany, Italy.

Biography
Born to in the quartiere of Santa Croce, Florence, to a family of limited means, his education led towards an ecclesiastical career, studying at the Collegio Eugeniano affiliated with the cathedral for nine years. After becoming a priest, he attended the seminary of the diocese, where he met the fellow scholar Giovanni Maria Lampredi, future professor at the University of Pisa for canon law and public rights. Obtaining in 1756 a degree from the Collegio Teologico dello Studio Fiorentino. That year he published epithalamic sonnets celebrating the marriage of G. Dini and the marchesa Teresa Gerini.

In 1759 he was granted a position at the Pieve dei San Giovanni e Lorenzo at Signa, and he pursued in their archives:  Giovanna da Signa (1761). With the arrival of the progressive Habsburg-Lorraine Grand-Dukes, Lastri joined a large academic, multivolume effort, under their patronage, to eulogize famous Tuscans. For example, Lastri wrote the biography of Machiavelli for the series. He published some criticism of the contemporary writer Giovanni Lami (1697-1770), founder of the Novelle Letterarie.

In 1772, Lastri returned to Florence to a local ecclesiastical position associated with the cathedral. He became a member of the Accademia dei Georgofili in 1770, and of the Accademia della Crusca and the Accademia dell'Agricoltura of Padua in 1773. Agricultural sciences remained an interest for him for years. In 1774, he published a popularly successful work on agronomic theories and economies abiding in Europe.

In 1776, he published a six-volume set of observations on cultural monuments and buildings in Florence, which proved as a guide for the sophisticated foreign travelers. The work, titled , with the help of Giuseppe del Rosso, continued to be published for some decades.

In 1781, he caused displeasure of the Grand Duke Peter Leopold for publishing some satirical comments in a gazette published by Giovanni Allegrini. His enthusiasm for writing never diminished, writing on diverse subjects such as culture and economics. In the 19th century, he continued to publish works on agricultural topics, translations, and religious works. He died in Sant'Ilario a Settimo in 1811.

Major works
Rules for landowners or  Venice: Printed in Graziosi, Sant'Apollinare, 1793.
. 1763
L'osservatore fiorentino sugli edifizi della sua patria; printed by Giuseppe and Pietro Allegrini, 1776, Florence.
. Venice: Printed in Graziosi, Sant'Apollinare, 1793.
. Venice: Printed in Graziosi, Sant'Apollinare, 1793.
Venice: Printed in Graziosi, Sant'Apollinare.
Venice: Printed in Graziosi, Sant'Apollinare, 1793
Veterinary and georgic recipes or  Venice: Printed in Graziosi, Sant'Apollinare, 1793.

Note
 
 Paraphrase from Italian Wikipedia entry

1731 births
1811 deaths
Italian biographers
Italian agronomists
18th-century Italian writers
18th-century Italian male writers
Writers from Florence